The Missouri Tigers men's basketball team represents the University of Missouri in the SEC. Prior to the 2012–2013 season, the basketball team represented the school in the Big 12 Conference. They are located in Columbia, Missouri, playing home games at Mizzou Arena (15,061). The team last played in the NCAA Division I men's basketball tournament in 2021. The Tigers' season in 2022–23 is their first under new head coach Dennis Gates, who was hired away from Cleveland State to replace the fired Cuonzo Martin. The Missouri men's basketball program was a charter member of the Big 12 Conference, formed from the Big Eight Conference in 1996.

History

Coaching history

Current coaching staff
Dennis Gates – Head Coach
Charlton Young – Assistant Coach
Dickey Nutt – Assistant Coach
Kyle Smithpeters – Assistant Coach
Matt Cline – Chief of Staff
Ryan Sharbaugh – Special Assistant to Head Coach
Michael Fly – Director of Scouting & Analytics
Chase Goldstein – Director of Basketball Operations
Sean Conaty –  Director of Basketball Athletic Performance
Dalon King – Scouting Coordinator
Perin Foote – Player Development Coordinator
Chris Perrin – Assistant Director of Sports Medicine
Shelby Johnson – Assistant Director of Sports Nutrition
Latisha Mayes – Executive Staff Assistant
Isaiah Buyaba - Graduate Assistant

Record vs. Big 12 opponents (1996-2012)

Record vs. other opponents (at least 15 games played)

Record vs. SEC opponents

Postseason

NCAA tournament results
The Tigers have appeared in the NCAA tournament 29 times. Their combined record is 23–29. However, their appearance in 1994 has been vacated by the NCAA, making their official record 20–28.

* Vacated by the NCAA

NCAA Tournament seeding history
The NCAA began seeding the tournament with the 1979 edition.

NIT results
The Tigers have appeared in the National Invitation Tournament (NIT) eight times. Their combined record is 2–8.

NCIT results
The Tigers appeared in one of the only two ever National Commissioners Invitational Tournaments. Their record is 0–1.

Retired numbers

Missouri has retired eight jersey numbers, with the most recent ones being the numbers of Derrick Chievous and John Brown in 2019.

Tigers in the NBA

Current

Jordan Clarkson (Los Angeles Lakers, Cleveland Cavaliers, Utah Jazz)
Michael Porter Jr. (Denver Nuggets)

Former
Kareem Rush (Los Angeles Lakers, Charlotte Bobcats, Indiana Pacers, Philadelphia 76ers, Los Angeles Clippers)
Keyon Dooling (Los Angeles Clippers, Miami Heat, Orlando Magic, New Jersey Nets, Milwaukee Bucks, Boston Celtics, Memphis Grizzlies)
Larry Drew (Sacramento Kings, Los Angeles Clippers, Los Angeles Lakers)
Jon Sundvold (Seattle SuperSonics, San Antonio Spurs, Miami Heat)
Steve Stipanovich (Indiana Pacers)
Doug Smith (Dallas Mavericks)
Byron Irvin (Portland Trail Blazers, Sacramento Kings, Washington Bullets)
Anthony Peeler (Los Angeles Lakers, Vancouver Grizzlies, Minnesota Timberwolves, Sacramento Kings, Washington Wizards)
Thomas Gardner (Chicago Bulls, Atlanta Hawks, Memphis Grizzlies, San Antonio Spurs)
Derrick Chievous (Houston Rockets, Cleveland Cavaliers)
Melvin Booker (Houston Rockets)
John Brown (Atlanta Hawks, Chicago Bulls, Utah Jazz)
Rickey Paulding (Detroit Pistons)
Linas Kleiza (Denver Nuggets)
Kim English (Detroit Pistons)
Jabari Brown (Los Angeles Lakers)
Al Eberhard (Detroit Pistons)
Phil Pressey (Boston Celtics, Philadelphia 76ers)
DeMarre Carroll (Memphis Grizzlies, Houston Rockets, Utah Jazz, Atlanta Hawks, Toronto Raptors, Brooklyn Nets)
Jontay Porter (Memphis Grizzlies)
Jonathan Williams (Los Angeles Lakers, Washington Wizards)

Tigers in the NBA G-League

Current
Jeremiah Tilmon, Lakeland Magic
Dru Smith, Sioux Falls Skyforce

Former
J. T. Tiller, Idaho Stampede
Thomas Gardner, Austin Toros & Reno Bighorns
Jason Horton, Rio Grande Valley Vipers
Marshall Brown, Rio Grande Valley Vipers
DeMarre Carroll, Dakota Wizards
Leo Lyons, Dakota Wizards
Kareem Rush, Los Angeles D-Fenders
Alex Oriakhi, Erie BayHawks
Jordan Clarkson, Los Angeles D-Fenders
Jabari Brown, Los Angeles D-Fenders
Stefhon Hannah, Reno Bighorns
Jordan Barnett, Wisconsin Herd & Fort Wayne Mad Ants
JaKeenan Gant, Fort Wayne Mad Ants
Jonathan Williams, South Bay Lakers & Capital City Go-Go

Tigers in European leagues

Current
Jason Conley, Kouvot (Finland)
Marcus Denmon, New Basket Brindisi (Italy)
Linas Kleiza, Olimpia Milano (Italy)
Rickey Paulding, EWE Baskets Oldenburg (Germany)
J.T. Tiller, Landstede Basketbal (Netherlands)

Tigers in other leagues

Current
Leo Lyons, Akita Northern Happinets, (Japan)
Ricardo Ratliffe, Seoul Samsung Thunders (South Korea)

Missouri Tigers All-Americans
Fred Williams, 1916
Craig Ruby, F, 1918–1919
George Williams, C, 1920–1921
Herb Bunker, G, 1921–1923
Arthur Browning, F, 1922–1923
Marshall Craig, F, 1930
Max Collings, 1931
John Lobsiger, G, 1939–1940
Bill Stauffer, C, 1952
Norm Stewart, G, 1956, former head coach at Northern Iowa (1961–1967) and Mizzou (1967–1999)
Charles Henke, C, 1961
John Brown, F, 1972–1973
Willie Smith, G, 1976
Ricky Frazier, F, 1982
Steve Stipanovich, C, 1983
Jon Sundvold, G, 1983
Derrick Chievous, F, 1987
Doug Smith, F, 1990
Anthony Peeler, G, 1992
Melvin Booker, G, 1994
 Marcus Denmon, G, 2012
 Phil Pressey, G, 2013

Participations in FIBA competitions
1976 FIBA Intercontinental Cup: 5th place

References

External links